The 2009 Pacific-10 Conference football season started on Thursday, September 3, 2009. Oregon won the Pac-10 title, which had been held by USC for the past seven years. Seven conference teams were invited to participate in post season bowl games, with only UCLA and USC winning their bowl games.

Previous season 
During the 2008 NCAA Division I FBS football season, all five Pac-10 teams won their bowl games:
 Rose Bowl - USC 38, Penn State 24
 Holiday Bowl - Oregon 42, Oklahoma State 31
 Sun Bowl - Oregon State 3, Pittsburgh 0
 Emerald Bowl - California 24, Miami 17
 Las Vegas Bowl - Arizona 31, BYU 21

Preseason 
Pre-season poll voted on by the media during the Pacific-10 Football Media Day, with the number of first-place votes shown in parentheses:

 USC (28)
 California (3)
 Oregon (1)
 Oregon State
 Arizona State
 Stanford
 UCLA
 Arizona
 Washington
 Washington State

Rankings

Highlights

September 
 September 3, 2009 – In the first game of the season for both teams, #14 Oregon was upset by #16 Boise State, 19-8.
 September 12, 2009 – UCLA defeated Tennessee, 19-15, before a crowd of 102,239 at Neyland Stadium. A last-minute Volunteers drive was stopped by the Bruins at the goal line.
 September 12, 2009 – With 1:05 left, USC's Stafon Johnson scored on a 2-yard run for a touchdown to give the Trojans an 18-15 win over Ohio State in front of a record 106,033 fans in Columbus.
 September 19, 2009 – The unranked Washington upset #3 ranked USC 16-13 in Seattle after Erik Folk scored the winning field goal. The Huskies would be ranked 25th the following day.
 September 26, 2009 – Oregon pulled an upset of #6 ranked California, 42-3 at Autzen Stadium.

October 
 October 3, 2009 – Stanford ended UCLA's unbeaten record, winning 24-16 at Stanford; California lost their second conference game, 30-3 to USC; Oregon won their fourth in a row with a 52-6 victory over Washington State. Oregon State beat Arizona State 28-17 at Sun Devil Stadium. It was Oregon State's first win over Arizona State at Sun Devil Stadium in 40 years.
 October 10, 2009 – Oregon won its fifth consecutive game, 24-10 over UCLA; Stanford lost its first conference game, 38-28 to Oregon State at Reser Stadium, Corvallis.
 October 17, 2009 – California won its first conference game against UCLA, the first win for the Bears in Southern California during Jeff Tedford's tenure as head coach. Cal had previously been 0-7 on the road against USC and UCLA.
 October 17, 2009 – USC held off Notre Dame for their eighth consecutive win over the Fighting Irish, 34-27.
 October 24, 2009 – The week's Pac-10 game of the week featured Oregon State against USC. The Beavers had the longest road winning streak at five games and had beaten the Trojans twice in their previous three meetings. USC had won 46 of the last 47 home games, not allowing more than 10 points at the Coliseum since mid-2007, and had surrendered a total of 38 points during the last ten home games. The Trojans managed to hold off the Beavers and win 42-36.
 October 31, 2009 – The Halloween match-up between USC (BCS No. 5) and Oregon (BCS No. 10) could determine the conference champion. USC had lost three in a row in the state of Oregon prior to the game. ESPN's College Gameday broadcast from Eugene. The Ducks won, 47-20, to stay on top of the conference standings. The defeat was the worst in the Pete Carroll era, giving up the most points and by the largest margin.
 October 31, 2009 – With 21 seconds left in the game, Giorgio Tavecchio kicked a 24-yard field goal to give California a comeback victory over Arizona State, 23-21.
 October 31, 2009 – Behind 19-3 in the fourth quarter, UCLA rallied back with two passing touchdowns and two two-point conversions to tie the game against Oregon State. James Rodgers scored for the Beavers in less than two minutes to pull out a win at home, 26-19.

November 
 November 7, 2009 - #7 Oregon's undefeated conference season came to an end at Stanford, being upset 51-42. Stanford became bowl-eligible for the first time since 2001 and earned a Top 25 ranking at #25. Running back Toby Gerhart ran for a school record 223 yards. Both teams have five victories in the Pac-10 championship race.
 November 7, 2009 - Oregon State upsets #23 California, with the Bears' last home victory against the Beavers being in 1997.
 November 14, 2009 - With the conference wide open, Toby Gerhart and the #25 Stanford Cardinal pulled their second upset in a row with a 55-21 road victory over #11 USC, the most points ever surrendered by the Trojans. USC has lost three of five at home to Stanford during the last ten years (2001, 2007, and 2009).
 November 14, 2009 - Oregon State defeated Washington, 48-21, to stay in the hunt for the conference championship.
 November 14, 2009 - California hung on to upset #18 Arizona 24-16 in the Golden Bears' final home season game.
 November 14, 2009 - With UCLA's 43-7 win over Washington State and Oregon's 44-21 win over Arizona State, four teams scored over 40 points.
 November 21, 2009 - #11 Oregon at Arizona was the game-of-the-week, with both teams playing for a trip to the Rose Bowl on New Year's Day. Arizona has never been to the Rose Bowl while Oregon has not been there since the 1994 season. In double overtime, Oregon came back to win the game 44-41.
 November 21, 2009 - #25 California upsets #17 Stanford in the 112th Big Game 34-28 to retain possession of the Stanford Axe, ending the Cardinal's Rose Bowl hopes. Stanford had scored 106 points in its past two games in victories over Oregon and USC.
 November 21, 2009 - #19 Oregon State defeats Washington State 42-10 to set up a head-to-head matchup against Oregon in the Civil War to decide the conference champion.
 November 28, 2009 - Rivalry Week: UCLA vs. USC, WSU vs. Washington, ASU vs. Arizona. The winners were Arizona 20-17, Washington 30-0, and USC 28-7.
 November 28, 2009 - Stanford rallied to defeat Notre Dame for the first time since 2001, 45-38.

December 
 December 3, 2009 - Oregon defeats Oregon State 37-33 in the Civil War to claim the conference championship and earn a spot in the 2010 Rose Bowl against Ohio State, Oregon's first trip since the 1995 Rose Bowl.
 December 5, 2009 - With Arizona defeating #20 USC 21-17, Arizona State became the only school in the Pac-10 that has not beaten the Trojans at least once during the Pete Carroll era.
 December 5, 2009 - Washington upsets #19 California 42-10, becoming the eleventh FBS team since 1946 to follow a winless 2008 season with five victories.
 December 12, 2009 – Army fell short of bowl eligibility by losing 17-3 in the Army-Navy game to allow UCLA to go to the EagleBank Bowl, scheduled for December 29, 2009.

Notes 
 September 3 - Oregon running back LeGarrette Blount was suspended by the university for the season after he punched Boise State defensive end Byron Hout in the chin after Hout had taunted him in front of Boise State head coach Chris Petersen at the end of their season opening game. Blount was reinstated on November 9, 2009 with the approval of the conference.
 September 28 - A weight room accident ended USC tailback Stafon Johnson's season.
 The Pac-10 will use football stars in a new promotion: California's Aaron Rodgers; Oregon's Joey Harrington; Oregon State's Mike Riley (coach); Southern California's Pete Carroll (coach), Marcus Allen, and Carson Palmer; Washington's Warren Moon; and Washington State's Drew Bledsoe.
 The media's only correct pre-season prediction was on Washington State.
 December 12 - Stanford running back Toby Gerhart finishes second to Alabama running back Mark Ingram II in the closest vote in Heisman Trophy history.
 December 17 - It was reported that Joe McKnight, USC tailback, may have violated NCAA rules by driving a sport utility vehicle owned by a Santa Monica businessman.
 January 1, 2010 - With Oregon's loss to Ohio State in the Rose Bowl, the Pac-10's bowl record for the 2009 season was 2-5. The previous season all five Pac-10 teams to receive bowl bids won their bowl games.
 January 10, 2010 – USC head coach Pete Carroll told his players that he will resign his position with the Trojans and become the new head coach of the Seattle Seahawks.
 January 13, 2010 – Tennessee head coach Lane Kiffin was named the new head coach of the Trojans. He had been an assistant coach at USC from 2001 to 2006 under Pete Carroll, including a stint as offensive coordinator.
 January 25, 2010 – California announced a $321 million retrofit of Memorial Stadium to begin in June.
 February 18, 2010 – Cal's defensive coordinator Bob Gregory left for Boise State and was replaced by Clancy Pendergast, former defensive coordinator for the Oakland Raiders. Stanford replaced defensive coordinator Ron Lynn with Vic Fangio, who had formerly been with the Baltimore Ravens. Former Chicago Bears offensive coordinator Ron Turner will be quarterbacks and wide receivers coach and former Minnesota Vikings assistant Derek Mason will be the defensive backs coach at Stanford.
 February 21, 2010 – At Oregon, LaMichael James was arrested on February 17 and pleaded not guilty to charges of fourth-degree assault, physical harassment and strangulation. Oregon kicker Rob Beard and defensive end Matt Simms were cited for misdemeanor assault investigation. Simms was dismissed from the team and kicker Mike Bowlin left the team. Simms and Beard have pleaded not guilty. Jamere Holland was dismissed from the Oregon football team for his Facebook comments.
 April 22, 2010 - Cal defensive end Tyson Alualu and running back Jahvid Best were selected as the 10th and 30th overall picks in the 2010 NFL Draft, respectively. They were the only Pac-10 players to be drafted in the first round. This also marked the first time since 2003 that two Cal players had been drafted in the first round of the NFL Draft.

 April 22–24, 2010 - Twenty eight players were selected in the 2010 NFL draft. USC had the most players selected, with seven. Arizona State had four, California, Oregon, Stanford, and UCLA each had three, Arizona and Washington had two each, and Oregon State had one player selected. No players from Washington State were drafted.

Players of the week

Pac-10 vs. BCS matchups

Bowl games

Head coaches 

 Mike Stoops, Arizona
 Dennis Erickson, Arizona State
 Jeff Tedford, California
 Chip Kelly, Oregon
 Mike Riley, Oregon State

 Jim Harbaugh, Stanford
 Rick Neuheisel, UCLA
 Pete Carroll, USC
 Steve Sarkisian, Washington
 Paul Wulff, Washington State

Awards and honors 
Doak Walker Award
 Toby Gerhart, RB, Stanford

Lou Groza Award
 Kai Forbath, PK, UCLA

Tom Hansen Conference Medal
 Jeff Byers, USC
 Toby Gerhart, Stanford

All-Americans 

Walter Camp Football Foundation All-America:
 Place kicker Kai Forbath, UCLA, first team All-America
 Defensive tackle Brian Price, UCLA, second-team All-America
 Safety Rahim Moore, UCLA, second-team All-America

FWAA All-America Team:
 Toby Gerhart, RB, Stanford
 Kai Forbath, PK, UCLA

Sporting News All-America team:
 Kai Forbath, PK, UCLA (first-team)
 Brian Price, DT, UCLA (second-team)
 Rahim Moore, S, UCLA (third-team)

AFCA Coaches' All-Americans First Team:
 Toby Gerhart, RB, Stanford
 Brian Price, DL, UCLA
 Kai Forbath, PK, UCLA
ESPN All-America team:
 Kai Forbath, PK, UCLA
 Brian Price, DT, UCLA

All-Pac-10 teams 
 Offensive Player of the Year: Toby Gerhart, RB, Stanford
 Pat Tillman Defensive Player of the Year: Brian Price, DT, UCLA
 Offensive Freshman of the Year: LaMichael James, RB, Oregon
 Defensive Freshman of the Year: Vontaze Burfict, MLB, Arizona State
 Coach of the Year: Chip Kelly, Oregon
 Charles Brown, OT, USC, Morris Trophy winner
 Stephen Paea, DT, Oregon State, Morris Trophy winner
First Team:

ST=special teams player (not a kicker or returner)

All-Academic 
First Team:

(2) Two-time first-team All-Academic selection;
(3) Three-time first-team All-Academic selection

2010 NFL Draft

References